Émile Louis Ragonot (12 October 1843 – 13 October 1895) was a French entomologist.  In 1885, he became president of the Société entomologique de France.

He named 301 new genera of butterflies and moths, mostly pyralid moths.

He is also the author of several books: 
 Diagnoses of North American Phycitidae and Galleriidae (1887) published in Paris
  Nouveaux genres et espèces de Phycitidae & Galleriidae (1888)
  Essai sur une classification des Pyralites (1891-1892)
  Monographie des Phycitinae et des Galleriinae. pp. 1–602 In N.M. Romanoff. Mémoires sur les Lépidoptères. Tome VIII. N.M. Romanoff, Saint-Petersbourg. xli + 602 pp. (1901)

Ragonot's collection can be found in the Muséum national d'histoire naturelle, Paris, France.

Notes

References 
 Luquet, G. C. 2001: [Ragonot, E. L.] - Alexanor 21 1999(4) Portrait

External links
 Ragonot , 1890. Essai sur la classification des Pyralites. - Annales de la Société Entomologique de France 10: 435-546

1843 births
1895 deaths
French lepidopterists
Presidents of the Société entomologique de France
19th-century French zoologists